Nikita Stanislavovich Nikolayev (born 24 February 1996) was a Russian football player.

Club career
He made his debut in the Russian Football National League for FC Volga Nizhny Novgorod on 5 October 2014 in a game against FC Khimik Dzerzhinsk.

References

External links
 Profile by Russian Football National League

1996 births
Sportspeople from Nizhny Novgorod
Russian footballers
FC Volga Nizhny Novgorod players
Association football defenders
FC Mordovia Saransk players
FC Nizhny Novgorod (2015) players
Living people